Jean Vanier Catholic High School may refer to:

Jean Vanier Catholic High School (Richmond Hill), in York Region, Ontario, Canada
Jean Vanier Catholic High School (Collingwood), in Collingwood, Ontario, Canada

See also
Jean Vanier Catholic Secondary School, Toronto, Canada